Jovan M. Žujović (Serbian Cyrillic: Јован M. Жујовић; 18 October 1856 – 19 July 1936) was a Serbian anthropologist, known as a pioneer in geology, paleontology and craniometry in Serbia.

Biography
After studying in Paris, he returned to Serbia and became the first Serb to scientifically research geology of Serbia and at the time neighbouring countries. Before Žujović, only two other scientists showed any interest in geology of Serbia, Johann Gottfried Herder and Ami Boué.

Žujović was named among the first four members of the Academy of Natural Sciences of the Serbian Royal Academy by King Milan I of Serbia on 5 April 1887. From 1915 to 1921, Žujović was the president of Serbian Royal Academy.

He is known, among other things, for his work in anthropology. In his book, Stone Age, published in 1893, relying mostly on French scientists, he reviewed the contemporary state of knowledge in paleoanthropology.

Later, between 1927, and 1929, in the book Genesis of the Earth and Our Country, he wrote about the biological past of the Earth starting from the beginning of mankind. The work takes particular interest in the history of the Balkan peninsula.

He was also a member of Yugoslav Academy of Sciences and Arts and Hungarian Academy of Sciences as well as geological society in Kiev, Ukraine.

In Serbian politics, he was a devoted democrat, Senator in 1901 and the member of the People's Radical Party of Nikola Pašić. After 1905, Žujović joined the Independent Radical Party of Ljubomir Stojanović. In the government of Independent Radicals, Žujović was a Minister of Foreign Affairs from 12 August to 15 December 1905. Also, Žujović held the post of Minister of Education and Religious Affairs on two occasions, from 16 May to 30 July 1905, and from 11 October 1909 to 12 September 1910.

Jovan Žujović had two brothers, Milenko Žujović, who authored books on jurisprudence, and Dr. Jevrem Žujović, whose mentor was Jean Alfred Fournier.

Selected works 
Geologische Uebersicht des Koenigreiches Serbien, Wien, 1886.
Sur les roches éruptives de la Serbie, Paris, 1893.
Sur les terrains sédimentaires de la Serbie, Paris, 1893.
Геологија Србије [Geology of Serbia] I-II, Belgrade 1893, 1900.
Општа геологија [General Geology], Belgrade 1923.
Les roches eruptives de la Serbie, Paris, 1924.

Legacy

Žujović was decorated Legion of Honour, Order of St Sava, Order of the White Eagle and several French and Bulgarian decorations. 
He is included in The 100 most prominent Serbs.

See also
 Sima Lozanić
 Svetolik Radovanović
 Sava Urošević
 Vladimir K. Petković
 Jovan Cvijić
 Petar Pavlović
 Mihailo Petrović Alas
 Ljubomir Jovanović
 Jelenko Mihailović
 Milan Nedeljković
 Milorad Dimitrijević-Kvaks

References

External links 
 

1856 births
1936 deaths
People from Gornji Milanovac
Vasojevići
Serbian anthropologists
Members of the Serbian Academy of Sciences and Arts
University of Belgrade Faculty of Philosophy alumni
Rectors of the University of Belgrade
Paleontology in Serbia
Serbian paleontologists
Burials at Belgrade New Cemetery
Education ministers of Serbia